Veasey is a surname. It is derived from the Old French pre-7th century envoisier, "to enjoy oneself", the Latin vitium, "pleasure", and the Anglo-Norman French, enveisie, "playful, merry". Notable people with the surname include:

Craig Veasey (born 1966), retired defensive tackle in the NFL
Dale Veasey (born 1958), retired American professional wrestler
Josephine Veasey (born 1930), British mezzo-soprano, associated with Wagner and Berlioz roles
Nick Veasey, British photographer working primarily with images created from X-ray imaging
Pam Veasey (born 1962), American television writer, producer and director
Sigrid Veasey, American physician and sleep researcher

See also
Feasey

References